is a railway station on the East Japan Railway Company (JR East) Tsugaru Line located in the city of Aomori, Aomori Prefecture, Japan.

Lines

Station layout
Tsugaru-Miyata Station has a single side platform serving bidirectional traffic. The station is unattended. It has no station building, but only a small weather shelter on the platform.

History
Tsugaru-Miyata Station was opened on November 25, 1959 as a station on the Japanese National Railways (JNR). With the privatization of the JNR on April 1, 1987, it came under the operational control of JR East.

Surrounding area
Aomori city government Okunai office

See also
 List of railway stations in Japan

External links

 

Stations of East Japan Railway Company
Railway stations in Aomori Prefecture
Tsugaru Line
Aomori (city)
Railway stations in Japan opened in 1959